Firefighters Upsala CK is a professional cycling team based in Sweden, which competes in elite road bicycle racing events such as the UCI Women's Road World Cup.

Team roster
 Saga Lindströms

Major wins
2014
Stage 1 Vuelta Internacional Femenina a Costa Rica, Flávia Oliveira
Stage 3 Vuelta a El Salvador, Flávia Oliveira

References

External links

Cycling teams based in Sweden
UCI Women's Teams
Cycling teams established in 2014